Randall Bailey (born September 13, 1974) is an American professional boxer. A veteran of the sport for over twenty years, he is a former world champion in two weight classes, having held the WBO light welterweight title from 1999 to 2000, and the IBF welterweight title in 2012. Additionally, he held the WBA interim light welterweight title in 2002. Nicknamed "The Knock-Out King" for his exceptional knockout power, Bailey is considered to be one of the hardest punchers in boxing history.

Professional career 

Bailey turned pro in 1996 and won his first 21 fights by knockout, including the WBO Light Welterweight Title with a 1st-round KO over Carlos Gonzalez in 1999. He defended the title twice before losing it in 2000 to Ener Julio in a close split decision.

In 2002, he won the interim WBA Light Welterweight title with a 3rd-round KO win over Demetrio Ceballos. He fought Diosbelys Hurtado for the vacant WBA Light Welterweight title but lost courtesy of a KO in the 7th round.  In 2003, he challenged DeMarcus Corley for the WBO Light Welterweight Title but lost a decision. In 2004, he fought Miguel Angel Cotto for the WBO Light Welterweight Title, losing by TKO in the 6th round. The fight was stopped on cuts.  In 2006, Bailey defeated Lenin Arroyo, Santos Pakau, Juan Polo Perez and Russell Stoner Jones to get the right to fight Shawn Gallegos for the IBA Intercontinental Light Welterweight title. He defeated Gallegos via a TKO inside eight rounds to become the new International Boxing Association Intercontinental champion.
In 2007, he beat Harrison Cuello by KO in the 2nd round. He then fought Herman Ngoudjo and lost by a split decision over 12 rounds in an IBF eliminator bout.  In 2008, Bailey fought a rematch with DeMarcus Corley and won via decision.
In 2009, Bailey kayoed Frankie Figueroa in the fourth round of an IBF eliminator to win another shot at the IBF world title against Juan Urango.  In the fight Bailey knocked down Juan Urango in the 6th round, the first time Urango had been knocked down.  Bailey tired late in the fight and in the 11th round his corner threw in the towel after Urango had begun dominating the fight.

Moving up to welterweight
After the loss to Urango, Bailey moved up to 147 pounds and fought Germaine Sanders, whom Bailey knocked down three times before winning an 8-round decision.   On March 19, 2010 Bailey fought an IBF title eliminator against Sugar Jackson. Bailey knocked out Jackson in 90 seconds of the 1st round. 
Instead of fighting the IBF Title against Jan Zaveck, he fought Said Ouali on December 10, 2010 in Antwerp, Belgium, with the fight resulting in a second round no-contest when Ouali was thrown out of the ring by Bailey and the fight could not continue.

Bailey became the IBF welterweight champion after knocking out top contender Mike Jones June 9, 2012, becoming a world champion in two weight divisions 10 years after winning his last title (the interim WBA light welterweight title). His emotional response in his post fight interview drew cheers from the crowd.

Bailey lost his IBF welterweight title against Devon Alexander as a main event on Showtime Championship Boxing.  He then won three straight fights, culminating in a knockout win over Shusaku Fujinaka for the WBO Asia Pacific Welterweight title, before a loss to Jeff Horn on April 27, 2016. He has not fought since.

Professional boxing record

References

External links 

|-

1974 births
Living people
People from Opa-locka, Florida
World welterweight boxing champions
Boxers from Florida
Sportspeople from Miami-Dade County, Florida
American male boxers
World Boxing Organization champions
International Boxing Federation champions
World light-welterweight boxing champions
Welterweight boxers